The  2017–18 season was the 129th season of competitive football by Celtic. They competed in the Scottish Premiership, League Cup, Scottish Cup, Champions League and Europa League. Celtic won all three domestic tournaments, completing a double treble.

Background
The previous season saw Celtic win the domestic treble, remaining undefeated domestically, recording only four draws in the Scottish Premiership. The squad reported back for pre-season training on 19 June, following a short break after the Scottish Cup Final on 27 May. Celtic assistant manager Chris Davies commented:

"It's a little bit different in England where you can have six or seven, or sometimes even eight weeks away. Some players have had the three weeks' rest after the cup final while others have had 10 days and some possibly even less. So we've managed that in terms of physical conditioning to make sure that they are in the best place possible. But we have noticed straight away that they've come back in really good condition and that is linked to not having such a long break. So we're happy with that, they are nice and fresh and have great enthusiasm and energy for the new season, so that's all good."

On 2 July 2017, Celtic announced that Scott Brown would receive a testimonial for ten years of service to the club.

Pre-season and friendlies
Celtic preceded the 2017–18 campaign with a pre-season tour of Austria, with matches against Blau-Weiß Linz and Rapid Wien. The Hoops then travelled to the Czech Republic to face Slavia Prague, which was followed by a trip to Ireland to play Shamrock Rovers. The pre-season schedule also included games against Lyon and Sunderland. Celtic recorded their first pre-season victory against Blau-Weiß Linz. Brendan Rodgers fielded a different team in each half, with a cameo appearance from his son, Anton, during the second period. The match played out in typical pre-season fashion, until James Forrest scored a late winner. Celtic's next opponents – Rapid Vienna of the Austrian Bundesliga – marked a step up in quality. Rapid took the lead on the stroke of half time, but this was later cancelled out by a Moussa Dembélé penalty, which earned Celtic a 1–1 draw. Following the match, Brendan Rodgers expressed his dissatisfaction with the first half performance, but praised the second half display and the progress made so far in pre-season. Celtic continued their preparations for the new season with a game against Slavia Prague. The match ended goalless, with Dedryck Boyata forced off through injury at the end of the first half. The Celtic manager was pleased with his team's efforts, commenting that the Czech champions provided an excellent test in the build-up to the UEFA Champions League qualifiers. Shamrock Rovers provided the opposition in Celtic's final match before the competitive action resumed. The Bhoys strolled to a 9–0 victory, with seven players on the scoresheet, including a first goal for Jonny Hayes. Brendan Rodgers was again delighted with the level of performance produced by his players. The day after Celtic's first European qualifier, a much-changed side was soundly beaten 4–0 by Lyon of Ligue 1. Celtic finished the match with nine academy players on the pitch. The Hoops rounded off pre-season with a game against Sunderland, recently relegated from the Premier League. As both clubs share Dafabet as their main sponsor, a one-off trophy was on offer for the winner. Celtic comfortably defeated the Championship side 5–0, with Callum McGregor scoring a hat-trick. Brendan Rodgers praised the large travelling support of 9,000 and commented that the result would boost confidence in the squad ahead of the next European qualifier.

Scottish Premiership

The Scottish Premiership fixture list was announced on 23 June 2017. Celtic began the defence of their title with a 4–1 victory against Heart of Midlothian at Celtic Park. On 4 November, Celtic broke their own British record for the number of games without defeat in all domestic competitions, a record set by Willie Maley's team that stood for 100 years. However, the unbeaten run ended at 69 games, following a 4–0 defeat to Heart of Midlothian at Tynecastle Park on 17 December. On 29 April 2018, Celtic won their seventh consecutive title and 49th overall after a 5–0 win against Rangers.

Scottish League Cup

On 30 July, Celtic were drawn to face Kilmarnock at Celtic Park in the second round of the 2017–18 Scottish League Cup. Captained by Kieran Tierney for the first time, in the absence of the suspended Scott Brown, Celtic won 5–0 to secure a berth in the quarter-finals. On 9 August, Celtic were drawn to face Dundee at Dens Park in the quarter-finals. The Bhoys continued their defence of the trophy, running out 4–0 winners with a double from James Forrest and goals from Scott Sinclair and Callum McGregor securing a return to Hampden Park for the semi-finals. On 21 September, Celtic were drawn to face Hibernian in the semi-finals. A keenly fought contest ended in a 4–2 victory for Celtic with Mikael Lustig and Moussa Dembélé both netting twice to seal Celtic's place in the final. On 26 November, Celtic retained the Scottish League Cup by defeating Motherwell 2–0. This was the 17th League Cup triumph in the club's history and the fourth trophy of Brendan Rodgers' reign.

Scottish Cup

On 20 November, Celtic were drawn to face Brechin City at Celtic Park in the fourth round of the 2017–18 Scottish Cup. Goals from James Forrest, Scott Sinclair, Olivier Ntcham, Dedryck Boyata and Odsonne Édouard secured a 5–0 victory for the cup holders. On 21 January 2018, Celtic were drawn to face Partick Thistle in the fifth round. A James Forrest hat-trick sealed a 3–2 win and Celtic's place in the quarter-finals for the fourth consecutive season. On 11 February, Celtic were drawn to face Greenock Morton in the quarter-finals. Goals from Moussa Dembélé and Odsonne Édouard secured a place in the semi-finals and a return to Hampden. On 4 March, Celtic were drawn to face Rangers in the semi-finals. The Bhoys sealed their place in the final with Tom Rogic, Callum McGregor, Moussa Dembélé and Olivier Ntcham all on the scoresheet. Celtic beat Motherwell 2–0 in the final on 19 May 2018, with goals from Callum McGregor and Olivier Ntcham ensuring Celtic's defence of the trophy.

Europe

UEFA Champions League

Second qualifying round

On 19 June, Celtic were drawn to face Linfield (Northern Ireland) or La Fiorita (San Marino) in the Second Qualifying Round of the UEFA Champions League. On 4 July, it was determined that Linfield would be Celtic's opponents, having defeated La Fiorita 1–0 on aggregate. The first leg took place at Windsor Park on 14 July, two days after The Twelfth. Celtic refused its ticket allocation due to concerns for supporter safety. Linfield later reiterated this, announcing that Celtic supporters would not be allowed to purchase tickets for the match. However, on the day of the match, the Northern Irish champions announced that away fans who had purchased tickets for the home end would be given their own section in the stadium. Celtic recorded a 2–0 victory in the first leg. The match did not pass without incident, as several objects were thrown towards Celtic players during the second half. Leigh Griffiths was controversially booked for simply drawing this to the referee's attention. Griffiths was later suspended by UEFA for one match, for tying a scarf to the goalpost after the game, which was deemed to have provoked a section of the home crowd. Celtic won 4–0 in the second leg, securing a place in the next round and a tie against Rosenborg. The club was again charged by UEFA for several offences, including illicit banners being displayed by the Green Brigade section of the home support. Celtic subsequently condemned the banners and suspended the group for the next two matches at Celtic Park.

Third qualifying round
On 19 July, it was determined that Celtic would face Rosenborg (Norway) in the Third Qualifying Round of the UEFA Champions League. The Norwegian champions overcame Dundalk to set up their first meeting with the Scottish champions since the 2001–02 UEFA Champions League group stage. In October 2001, an Alan Thompson free-kick secured a 1–0 victory for Celtic in Glasgow. Later that month, Martin O'Neill's team succumbed to a 2–0 defeat in Trondheim, with former Celtic player Harald Brattbakk scoring both goals. Brendan Rodgers' side were forced to play without a recognised striker in the first leg, which finished goalless. Injuries to Moussa Dembélé and Leigh Griffiths – the latter was also suspended – meant that Tom Rogic was tasked with deputising in a False 9 role. The return leg saw James Forrest start in the same position and score the deciding goal to seal Celtic's place in the next round. The result secured European football for the club until the end of the year.

Play-off round
On 4 August, Celtic were drawn to face Astana (Kazakhstan) in the Play-Off Round of the UEFA Champions League. The sides met one round earlier in the previous season's competition, with the Scottish champions recording a 3–2 victory on aggregate. Celtic cruised to a 5–0 victory in the first leg, with two own goals bookending a double from Scott Sinclair and a goal from James Forrest. Nir Bitton deputised at centre half – injuries ruled Dedryck Boyata and Erik Sviatchenko out of the tie – and was singled out for praise by Brendan Rodgers in the aftermath. The second leg saw Celtic record their first loss in all competitions since November 2016, when they were defeated by Barcelona at Celtic Park. Although the Hoops lost 4–3 on the night, goals from Scott Sinclair, Olivier Ntcham and Leigh Griffiths ensured Celtic's place amongst Europe's elite for the second consecutive season. In addition, Celtic's 8–4 aggregate win became the highest-scoring tie in UEFA Champions League play-off history.

Group stage
On 24 August, the draw for the 2017–18 UEFA Champions League Group stage was made. Celtic were drawn in Group B along with Bayern Munich (Pot 1), Paris Saint-Germain (Pot 2) and Anderlecht (Pot 3). Celtic last met the German and Belgian champions in the 2003–04 season, and have not faced the Ligue 1 side since 1995. Paris Saint-Germain inflicted Celtic's heaviest ever home defeat in European competition on Matchday 1, with goals from the most expensive forward line in history: Neymar, Kylian Mbappé and Edinson Cavani. Following the match, Brendan Rodgers suggested his team played like under-12s in the early stages of the game. Celtic did however respond on Matchday 2 in Brussels, recording a priceless victory over Anderlecht. Leigh Griffiths, Patrick Roberts and Scott Sinclair were on the scoresheet as the club secured its second away victory in Champions League history, and its first away victory since 2012, when Celtic defeated Spartak Moscow. Despite a valiant display against Bayern Munich at Celtic Park and scoring the first goal against Paris Saint-Germain in European competition that season, Celtic lost all four remaining games in the group, but did parachute into the 2017–18 UEFA Europa League knockout phase after finishing with a better head-to-head record against Anderlecht.

Group B

Matches

UEFA Europa League

On 11 December, Celtic were drawn to face Zenit Saint Petersburg in the Last 32 of the 2017–18 UEFA Europa League. Callum McGregor's strike gave Celtic a narrow first-leg advantage, however, a 3–0 defeat in Saint Petersburg brought the Bhoys' involvement in European competition to an end for the 2017–18 season.

Round of 32

Statistics

Appearances and goals

|-
! colspan=16 style=background:#dcdcdc; text-align:center| Goalkeepers
|-

|-
! colspan=16 style=background:#dcdcdc; text-align:center| Defenders
|-

|-
! colspan=16 style=background:#dcdcdc; text-align:center| Midfielders
|-

|-
! colspan=16 style=background:#dcdcdc; text-align:center| Forwards
|-

|}

Goalscorers

Last updated: 19 May 2018

Disciplinary record
Includes all competitive matches. Players listed below made at least one appearance for Celtic first squad during the season.

Hat-tricks

(H) – Home; (A) – Away; (N) – Neutral

Clean sheets
As of 19 May 2018.

Attendances

Team statistics

League table

Competition Overview

Champions League: 
Scottish Premiership: 
Scottish League Cup: 
Scottish Cup:

Results by round

Club

Technical Staff

Kit
Supplier: New Balance / Sponsors: Dafabet (front) and Magners (back)

The club was in the third year of a deal with manufacturer New Balance. The kit range for the 2017–18 season paid tribute to the Lisbon Lions; the kits had a line on each side to represent the handles of the European Cup. The kits also included a commemorative crest.

Home: The home kit was designed to celebrate the 50th anniversary of Celtic's victory in the 1967 European Cup Final. The kit followed the traditional style, with a gold club crest.
Away: The away kit featured dark green hoops with a gold trimming. It kit was designed to reflect the Celtic away kit worn during the 1966–67 season.
Third: The third kit was cactus green and featured a black crest. The Celtic and Inter Milan teams which competed for the trophy were commemorated in the inner back neck of the jersey, where green and white hoops and black and blue stripes could be found.
Fourth: The third pink kit released for the 2016–17 season returned as a fourth kit due to a kit clash in both away matches against Hibernian.

Transfers

In

Out

See also
 List of Celtic F.C. seasons
Nine in a row

References

Celtic F.C. seasons
Celtic
Celtic
Celtic
Scottish football championship-winning seasons